Rene Zahkna (born 2 October 1994) is an Estonian biathlete. Zahkna won two medals at the 2015 European Championships and two medals at the 2014 European Championships, two medals at the 2013 Junior World Championships and two medals at the 2012 Winter Youth Olympics. He debuted in the Biathlon World Cup on March 13, 2014 in Kontiolahti, Finland, finishing 68th. He earned his first World cup points on January 13, 2016 in Ruhpolding, Germany, with a 34th position finish.

He represented Estonia at the 2018 Winter Olympics.

Biathlon results 
All results are sourced from the International Biathlon Union.

Olympic Games

*The mixed relay was added as an event in 2014.

World Championships

World Cup

Team podiums
1 podiums

Winter Youth Olympics

Junior/Youth World Championships

European Championships

Personal
His father is a former biathlete Hillar Zahkna.

See also
List of professional sports families

References

External links
 
 Eesti Spordileksikon

1994 births
Living people
Sportspeople from Võru
Estonian male biathletes
Biathletes at the 2012 Winter Youth Olympics
Biathletes at the 2018 Winter Olympics
Biathletes at the 2022 Winter Olympics
Olympic biathletes of Estonia
Youth Olympic silver medalists for Estonia